In Greek mythology, Pheno (Ancient Greek: Φηνὼ) was the Athenian woman and daughter of Clytius. She married Lamedon, king of Sicyon, and bore him a daughter Zeuxippe.

Note

References 

 Pausanias, Description of Greece with an English Translation by W.H.S. Jones, Litt.D., and H.A. Ormerod, M.A., in 4 Volumes. Cambridge, MA, Harvard University Press; London, William Heinemann Ltd. 1918. . Online version at the Perseus Digital Library
 Pausanias, Graeciae Descriptio. 3 vols. Leipzig, Teubner. 1903.  Greek text available at the Perseus Digital Library.

Characters in Greek mythology
Women in Greek mythology